The 2010 Tulsa Golden Hurricane football team represented the University of Tulsa in the 2010 NCAA Division I FBS football season. The Golden Hurricane, led by fourth-year head coach Todd Graham, were members of Conference USA (C-USA) in the West Division and played their home games at Skelly Field at H. A. Chapman Stadium, also known simply as Chapman Stadium. They finished the season 10–3, 6–2 in C-USA to claim a share of the west division title. However, due to their loss to SMU, they did not represent the division in the 2010 Conference USA Championship Game. They were invited to the Hawaii Bowl, where they defeated Hawaii, 62–35. On January 9, 2011, Chad Morris left to fill the offensive coordinator job at Clemson University. On January 10, Todd Graham announced he was leaving Tulsa to take the head coaching job at the University of Pittsburgh.

Schedule

NFL Draft
6th Round, 174th Overall Pick by the Miami Dolphins—Sr. FB/TE Charles Clay

References

Tulsa
Tulsa Golden Hurricane football seasons
Hawaii Bowl champion seasons
Tulsa Golden Hurricane football